Shadow of the Hegemon (2000) is a science fiction novel by American writer Orson Scott Card, the second novel in the Ender's Shadow series (often called the Bean Quartet). It is also the sixth novel in the Ender's Game series. It is told mostly from the point of view of Bean, a largely peripheral character in the original novel Ender's Game but the central protagonist of the parallel narrative Ender's Shadow. Shadow of the Hegemon was nominated for a Locus Award in 2002.

Plot summary

In Shadow of the Hegemon, all of the Battle School graduates, except Ender, return to Earth in 2197 A.D., where Ender's brother Peter, using his online pseudonym Locke, arranges for Ender to be returned to Earth; but Valentine, under the pseudonym Demosthenes, uses Peter's violent past against him to keep Ender exiled. Shortly after their return, the members of the unit Ender commanded (called his Jeesh, an Arabic word meaning 'army'), with the exception of Bean, are seized as strategists in an upcoming struggle for world dominance, by Achilles de Flandres (ah-SHEEL), who subjects them to solitary confinement. Bean having imprisoned Achilles in the previous novel, Achilles attempts (unsuccessfully) to kill Bean. The Delphikis go into hiding, while Bean joins forces with Sister Carlotta. After he discovers an encoded message sent by Petra confirming that the Russians are Achilles' backers, he works to free her and the others, while helping Peter come to power.

When Peter publishes under the 'Locke' pseudonym that Achilles is a murderer, the Battle School graduates are released, excepting Petra, whom Achilles brings to India. From there, he requests plans for an invasion of Burma and then Thailand, for which Indian Battle School graduates, including Sayagi and Virlomi, develop plans for brute-force attacks involving long supply lines. Petra arranges a different plan of stripping India's garrisons along the Indo-Pakistani border, which she expects will never happen, until a meeting with Pakistan's prime minister, in which Achilles encourages the two nations to make peace among themselves and declare war on other neighbors; secretly giving China the opportunity to annihilate the Indian army.

Petra finds an ally in Virlomi, who reveals to Bean that Petra is a prisoner, and eventually escapes the military compound to bring rescue. Courtesy of Bean's and Sister Carlotta's assets, "Locke" is nominated publicly for the position of Hegemon, allowing Peter to unmask himself. Meanwhile, Bean enters the Thai military under the patronage of Suriyawong (Suri), a fellow Battle School graduate and (nominal) head of Thailand's planning division, and trains 200 Thai soldiers against India. When the Thai Commander-in-Chief betrays Suriyawong and Bean, Bean hides himself and Suri in the barracks of his troops, and sends word for rescue, while Thailand prepares for war. Sister Carlotta's airplane, en route to Bean's location, is destroyed by a Chinese SAM, and Bean receives an earlier-recorded message, in which she describes the relationship between Anton's Key and Bean's brilliance, but also informs him that his life expectancy will be drastically reduced as a result.

Bean and Suriyawong use the troops Bean has trained to halt Indian supply lines. While striking a bridge, they meet Virlomi, who defects to their side. With the aid of Bean's soldiers and Locke's distinguished connections, they move on Hyderabad, where Bean rescues Petra. Furthermore, "Locke" publishes an essay detailing the Chinese betrayal just as it is happening, and on the basis of this prescience (and other miracles over the years) Peter Wiggin is elected Hegemon over the world.

Characters
Julian "Bean" Delphiki
Petra Arkanian
Achilles de Flandres
Sister Carlotta
Peter Wiggin
Hyrum Graff
Suriyawong
Virlomi
John Paul Wiggin
Theresa Wiggin

History
Card accredits two books in particular as being profoundly influential in the writing of this novel: Thailand: A Short History by David K. Wyatt and Raj: The Making and Unmaking of British India by Lawrence James. In addition to these two books he was also inspired by Phillip Absher, who was one of the readers of the first draft. Phillip suggested that the Petra arc of the novel was anticlimactic. Upon hearing this criticism, Card rethought this entire book and decided to split it into two books. At the time of publication, Card thought the Bean series (Shadow series) of the Enderverse would only be four books long.

Reception
The book has a rating of 3.9 out of 5, with 60,000 votes on Goodreads.

See also

List of Ender's Game characters
List of works by Orson Scott Card
 Insignia Trilogy - science-fiction series featuring both young recruits training in space and similar geopolitics

References

External links

 About the novel Shadow of the Hegemon from Card's website
 Shadow of the Hegemon at Worlds Without End

2001 American novels
American science fiction novels
Ender's Game series books
Tor Books books